Two ships have borne the name Abraham Lincoln, in honor of the 16th President of the United States.

 , a ballistic missile submarine
 , an aircraft carrier currently in service

See also 

United States Navy ship names